Parkpoom Wongpoom (born 1978) is a Thai filmmaker and screenwriter. With Banjong Pisanthanakun, he co-directed and co-wrote the hit 2004 Thai horror film, Shutter, and the 2007 horror film, Alone.

Biography

Education and early career
Parkpoom Wongpoom graduated from the Department of Film and Video, Faculty of Communication Arts at Rangsit University in 2000.

His first short film, the 8-minute Luang Ta (Old Monk), was shown at many film festivals, including the Thai Short Film and Video Festival, the Clermont-Ferrand International Short Film Festival, the Singapore International Film Festival and the Pusan International Short Film Festival. It won the Best Director and Best Thai Short Film awards at the Bangkok Film Festival in 2001.

Parkpoom's second film, In the Eyes, a 14-minute short about a boy's first sexual experience, was also featured at many festivals, including the Asiexpo in Lyon, France, the Puchon International Fantastic Film Festival, the Pusan International Film Festival, the Canadian World Wide Short Film Festival, Flickerfest in Australia and the Solothurn Film Festival.

Parkpoom has also served as a short-films competition jury member on the 2004 Nokia Creative Arts Awards in Kuala Lumpur and the 2005 Bangkok International Film Festival.

Feature films
Parkpoom's first feature film, Shutter, was co-directed and co-written with Banjong Pisanthanakun. With a story about ghost images in photographs and a haunted photographer (portrayed by Ananda Everingham), the film was the biggest box-office hit in Thailand that year, and was also a hit in Singapore, Malaysia, the Philippines and Brazil.

The two teamed up again in 2007 for Alone, which also was a box-office hit and played at many film festivals, including the 2007 Bangkok International Film Festival, where it was in competition for Best ASEAN Film.

Both Shutter and Alone have been optioned for remakes in the United States.

Filmography

Feature films
 Shutter (2004)
 Alone (2007)
 4bia (2008)
 Phobia 2 (2009)
 Homestay (2018)

Short films
 Luang ta (2000)
 In the Eyes (2003)

References

External links
 

Living people
Parkpoom Wongpoom
Parkpoom Wongpoom
Horror film directors
1978 births